XHTV-TDT (virtual channel 4), founded in 1950 by Romulo O'Farril, is a flagship TV station of Televisa and carries its FORO news network. FOROtv is available on various cable television companies and SKY México satellite service, along with several providers in the United States as part of Televisa and Univision's partnership (albeit with local programming and sports replaced with American ads and recorded news blocks). It is the oldest TV station in Mexico and Latin America.

History

XHTV was Mexico's first television station and one of the building blocks of Telesistema Mexicano, which became Televisa in 1972.

In 2001, XHTV began using the name 4TV with a program lineup targeted at the Mexico City area and the slogan "El Canal de la Ciudad" (The City Channel).

On August 30, 2010 (sixty years after the channel was founded), the channel's name was changed to FOROtv (literally "Forum TV"), with most of Televisa's news programs moved here, such as Las Noticias por Adela (from XEQ), and with new news and talk programs being created. Prior to this, the channel, under the name of "Canal de la Ciudad" ("The City's Channel"), broadcast programs targeted at Mexico City's metro area, as well as reruns of American series and blocks of Mexican movies.

Under this format, the channel seeks to emulate the success achieved by its predecessor ECO (which operated from 1988 to 2001). It competes in a crowded cable news space with such channels as TV Azteca's adn40 and Azteca Noticias, Telefórmula, Efekto TV, CNN en Español, Excélsior TV, and Milenio Televisión, among others.

Digital television

Digital subchannels 
The station's digital channel is multiplexed:

Analog-to-digital conversion
XHTV, along with other Mexico City TV stations, shut off its analog signal on VHF channel 4, on December 17, 2015, at 12:00 a.m., as part of the federally mandated transition from analog to digital television. The station's digital signal remained on its pre-transition UHF channel 49, using PSIP to display XHTV's virtual channel as 4 on digital television receivers.

In October 2016, XHTV added shopping channel CJ Grand Shopping as subchannel 4.2; this channel was deleted in March 2019 and replaced in June with a new CV Shopping channel wholly owned by Televisa.

On November 3, 2018, XHTV relocated from channel 49 to 15 to allow the 600 MHz band to be used for mobile services. It was the last station to repack in Mexico City.

Current programs

Original productions 
Some of the programs on XHTV as Foro TV currently include the following:

Las Noticias ("The News")
Estrictamente Personal (Strictly Personal)
Por las Mañanas (In the Mornings)
Paralelo 23 ("The 23rd Parallel", passes through central Mexico)
A las Tres ("At 3:00 p.m.", anchored by Ana Paula Ordorica)
Hora 21 ("21st Hour"; airs at 9:00 p.m., anchored by Julio Patán)
En Una Hora ("In One Hour")
El Centro del Debate ("Debate Center")
Agenda Pública ("The Public Agenda")
Es La Hora De Opinar ("It's Time for Your Opinions")
Fractal (tech news)
Noticias MX (Mexico City report, anchored by Enrique Campos Suarez)
Por el Planeta (ecology news)

Sports Events 
National Football League (one live game per week)
Major League Baseball
Liga MX (certain matches in special cases)
Copa MX (only the final game)
Formula 1
NASCAR Toyota Series

Previous programming 
Las Noticias por Adela
El Mañanero
Versus (daily sports news)

See also
Noticieros Televisa

References

External links

Television stations in Mexico City
Television channels and stations established in 1950
Spanish-language television stations in Mexico